Anna Friederike Mathilde Klein (née Plaubel, born 1900, sometimes referred to as Anna Klein-Plaubel, date of death unknown) was a German concentration camp guard who was chief warden at the Ravensbrück concentration camp.

On 14 September 1939, she arrived in Ravensbrück. In August 1943, she was promoted to the highest rank of Chef Oberaufseherin (Chief senior supervisor), with control and the responsibility of monitoring all of Ravensbrück camp. Klein reached the highest rank that the Nazis allowed a woman in a camp; she received a higher salary, better housing, better food (which was not cooked by detainees, but by other Schutzstaffel (SS) women), the best clothes, more power, and this hierarchical title of honour. She oversaw all guards at Ravensbrück until the SS assigned her to the Sachsenhausen concentration camp in September 1944. There, she served as a supervisor, with the same rank until the liberation of the camp by the Allies in April 1945.

For the period of her camp service, August 1943 to August 1944 in Ravensbrück, Klein was charged with mistreatment of inmates of Allied nationality and participation in the selection of inmates for the gas chamber in the seventh Ravensbrück Trial in Hamburg. This trial lasted from 2 July to 21 July 1948. She was acquitted on 21 July 1948 due to lack of evidence.

Notes

References

1900 births
Year of death missing
Female guards in Nazi concentration camps
Ravensbrück concentration camp personnel
Hamburg Ravensbrück trials
Sachsenhausen concentration camp personnel